The following is a list of the MTV Europe Music Award winners and nominees for Best Korean Act.

Winners and nominees
Winners are listed first and highlighted in bold.

2010s

2020s

References

MTV Europe Music Awards